Sardar Salim Haider Khan is a Pakistani politician who had been a member of the National Assembly of Pakistan from 2008 to 2013.

Political career

He ran for the seat of the Provincial Assembly of the Punjab as a candidate of Pakistan Peoples Party (PPP) from Constituency PP-18 (Attock-IV) in 2002 Pakistani general election but was unsuccessful. He received 37,140 votes and lost the seat to Malik Muhammad Anwar, a candidate of Pakistan Muslim League (Q) (PML-Q).

He was elected to the National Assembly of Pakistan from Constituency NA-59 (Attock-III) as a candidate of PPP in 2008 Pakistani general election. He received 71,400 votes and defeated Waseem Gulzar, a candidate of PML-Q. In November 2008, he was inducted into the federal cabinet of Prime Minister Yousaf Raza Gillani and was appointed as Minister of State for Defence Production where he served until February 2011. In June 2012, he was inducted into the federal cabinet of Prime Minister Raja Pervaiz Ashraf and was appointed Minister of State for Defence where he served until March 2013.

He ran for the seat of National Assembly from Constituency NA-59 (Attock-III) as a candidate of PPP in 2013 Pakistani general election but was unsuccessful. He received 31,831 votes and lost the seat to Muhammad Zain Elahi.

References

Living people
Pakistani MNAs 2008–2013
People from Attock District
Pakistan People's Party politicians
Defence Ministers of Pakistan
Year of birth missing (living people)